The Wombles were a British novelty pop group, featuring musicians dressed as the characters from the children's TV show The Wombles, which in turn was based on the children's book series by Elisabeth Beresford. Songwriter and record producer Mike Batt wrote and also performed many commercially successful singles and albums as 'The Wombles', including the TV series' theme tune. British Hit Singles & Albums jokingly referred to them as the "furriest (and possibly the tidiest) act... are natives of Wimbledon Common, London". In 2011, the band played at The Glastonbury Festival.

History
Filmfair acquired the television rights to The Wombles and commissioned Batt to write the theme song. He waived the flat fee for writing a single song and instead secured the rights to write songs under the name 'The Wombles'.

The band released several albums and singles. All four studio albums went gold, and four of the singles reached the Top 10 in the UK Singles Chart. The Wombles were the most successful music act of 1974 in the UK, with albums in the UK charts for more weeks than any other act.

A song called "Wombling U.S.A.", written specifically to break into the American market, was recorded in 1975 but was not released until 2000 when it was included on the cassette version of "I Wish It Could Be a Wombling Merry Christmas Every Day". However, a previous single entitled, "Wombling Summer Party" which was also written specifically to try to break into the American market charted on the USA Billboard Hot 100 Charts, peaking as high as No. 55 during August of 1974.

Live performances
In January 1974 Batt appeared on an edition of Cilla Black's BBC television series as Orinoco, having been accompanied onstage by guest Bernard Cribbins, to plug "The Wombling Song". Consequently, when the single charted, the "band" were invited to perform on Top of the Pops. Additional Womble suits of the other main characters were hastily made for the live performance.

When appearing as a band, the Wombles were always played by experienced musicians dressed in full costume. Batt continued to perform as Orinoco, regularly accompanied by drummer Clem Cattini dressed as Bungo and guitarist Chris Spedding dressed as Wellington. Both had previously recorded with Batt. On one edition of Top of the Pops, the costumes were filled by members of Steeleye Span.

Tim and Andy Renton, who had worked with Batt in the latter incarnation of Hapshash and the Coloured Coat also donned the costumes, along with Robin Le Mesurier, who was later expelled from the band following his arrest for possession of cannabis.

The band appeared as the interval act at the Eurovision Song Contest 1974, staged at the Brighton Dome, at which ABBA became internationally known.

The Wombles' split and Wellington's solo career
The Wombles 'split' in 1976 and, following a severe drought that summer, a single called "Rainmaker" (credited solely to Wellington Womble rather than the entire band) was released.

Legacy
Although Batt was sensitive about the legacy of the band for a long time, more recently he has talked of their music with pride. In a 2008 interview, he said: "It is hard to be taken seriously with the Wombles hanging around my neck like a furry anvil." In a programme with Aled Jones on the BBC in 2010 Batt pointed out that, in balance, the Wombles also served as a "furry balloon" as it gave him his first chart success. In 2021, interviewed by Mark Ellen and David Hepworth, Batt stated: "I kept the momentum going by changing the style of the records. I used it as an exercise in teaching myself to arrange music...The Wombles were perfect for me because the very necessity to have to change from single to single, style to style...meant I could be as adventurous as I wanted. It was uncool but it was fun, and fun is often uncool...People remember it now with a lot more affection than I got for it at the time."

In 2022, Batt revealed that he had destroyed the multitrack tapes from The Wombles' recording sessions so that the band's music could not be remixed after his death.

Glastonbury Festival
The Wombles played the Avalon tent at the Glastonbury Festival in June 2011 with Chris Spedding joining them as a guest guitarist for the final song. Michael Eavis, the founder of the Glastonbury Festival, had said that booking the Wombles was "a bit of a mistake". Batt quipped that Uncle Bulgaria had been offended by Eavis' comments and had withdrawn an offer to tidy up the site after the festival.

Personnel

The Wombles
Orinoco (Mike Batt) – vocals, piano
Wellington (Chris Spedding) – lead guitar
Tomsk (Les Hurdle) – bass
Bungo (Clem Cattini) – drums, percussion
Tobermory (Simon Chandler-Honnor) – piano, keyboards
Madame Cholet (Rex Morris) – saxophone
Great Uncle Bulgaria (Paul Peabody) – violin

Additional personnel
Amy Adkins – percussion, violin, vocals
Eric Bulger – keyboards, saxophone, vocals
Richard Kingston – keyboards, percussion, vocals
Simon DeMarco - the local postie, Band PA
Morgan Kent - Drums      [Top of The Pops 1974]

Discography

Studio albums

Compilation albums
{| class="wikitable"
|-
!Year
!width="400"|Album details
|-
|1974
|The Wombles (3 Record Collection)
Released: 1974
Label: CBS (66323)
Format: 12" vinyl
 Box set of first three albums
|-
|1975
|The Best of The Wombles – 20 Wombling Greats
Released: 1975
Label: CBS (5022)
Peak chart position: 29 (UK)
Format: 12" vinyl/cassette
|-
|1976
|The Best of The Wombles – 20 Wombling Greats (reissue)
Released: 1976
Label: Warwick/CBS 
Format: 12" vinyl/cassette
|-
|1978
|The Wombles Christmas PartyReleased: 1978
Label: SHM (977)
Format: 12" vinyl/cassette
|-
|1983
|The Wombles Christmas Album
Released: 1983
Label: CBS (25805)
Format: 12" vinyl
|-
|1989
|Wombling Hits
Released: 1989
Label: CBS (466118 1)
Format: 12" vinyl/cassette
|-
|1997
|Underground, Overground – The Ultimate Wombles Collection
Released: 1997
Label: RDCD (2181–2)
Format: CD/cassette
|-
|1998
|The Best Wombles Album So Far – Volume 1Released: 16 March 1998
Label: Columbia (489562 2)
Peak chart position: 26 (UK)
Weeks in chart: 3 (UK)
Format: CD/cassette
|-
|2000
|The Wombles CollectionReleased: 20 November 2000
Label: Dramatico (DRAMCD0001)
Format: CD/cassette
|-
|2005
|The Very Best of the WomblesReleased: 3 October 2005
Label: Columbia (504418 2)
Format: CD
|-
|2011
|The W FactorReleased: 28 November 2011
Label: Dramatico (B0062JIBLS)
Format: CD and MP3 Download
|}

Singles

Film Soundtracks

Parodies
The BBC Four comedy program Don't Watch That, Watch This showed a dubbed footage of The Wombles from TOTP2, of the Wombles purportedly performing "Anarchy in the U.K." live in June 1988. The scrolling caption during the song read "During the early eighties the Wombles reformed as a funk soul fusion. But the project soon failed and the group disbanded, only to come together again as the Dixie Minstrel Wombles. In 1988 the original line up were reunited for the third time to record their version of this Sex Pistols classic.... for a Pot Noodle commercial. Later released as a single it reached 57 on the charts".

The comedy film The Rutles'' featured a Ringo Starr-inspired character named Barrington Womble who "shortened his name to save time...he simply became Barry Wom."

References

External links
Chris Spedding – Wombles index
  as the TV show
  as the band
 

Bands with fictional stage personas
Musical groups established in 1973
Musical groups disestablished in 1976
The Wombles
Fictional musical groups